Alex Murphy (born 26 December 1997) is an Irish actor. He is best known for his role as Conor MacSweeney in the 2016, comedy film The Young Offenders, for which he received an IFTA nomination for best actor in a lead film role. He went on to reprise his role in the 2018 television series of the same name, produced by the BBC. In 2022, he appeared in the Hulu/BBC/RTÉ television adaptation of television adaptation of Conversations with Friends.

Filmography

Awards and nominations
In March 2019 along with his co star from The Young Offenders Chris Walley, Alex was jointly nominated for a Royal Television Society Award in The Best Male comedy performance category.

References

External links
 

Living people
21st-century Irish actors
Irish male film actors
Irish male television actors
People from County Cork
1997 births